Redouane Barkaoui (born April 4, 1979) is a former Moroccan footballer.

Club career

Pelita Jaya 
Pelita Jaya are delighted to welcome Redouane Barkaoui to the Club where he will help them to challenge for the remainder of the 2009/10 season. Redouane Barkaoui helped Pelita Jaya defend in the Indonesian Super League after win play-off position.

Persela Lamongan 
On 5 September 2010, Redouane Barkaoui signed a year contract with Indonesian Super League club Persela.

Widad Fes 
Redouane officially joined the Botola League, signing contract with the club Widad Fes.

References

External links
 Profile at liga-Indonesia.co.id

1979 births
Moroccan footballers
Liga 1 (Indonesia) players
Living people
Expatriate footballers in Indonesia
Persela Lamongan players
Pelita Bandung Raya players
Persib Bandung players
Al-Hilal Club (Omdurman) players
Association football forwards
Wydad de Fès players
Raja CA players